This is a list of Liberian counties by Human Development Index as of 2021.

References 

Liberia
Human Development Index
Counties by Human Development Index